Waltham may refer to:

Business
 Waltham Watch Company, American watch manufacturer, pioneer in the industrialisation of the manufacturing of watch movements
 The Waltham system, industrial efficiency system

Music
 Waltham (band), American rock band

Places

Canada
Waltham, Quebec

England
Bishop's Waltham, Hampshire
Great Waltham, Essex
Little Waltham, nearby
London Borough of Waltham Forest
including Walthamstow
that includes Walthamstow Village
Waltham, Kent
Waltham, Lincolnshire
New Waltham, nearby
Waltham Abbey, Essex, the town
taking its name from Waltham Abbey (abbey)
Waltham Bury, Essex
Waltham Chase, Hampshire
Waltham Cross, Hertfordshire
Waltham Holy Cross Urban District, a former urban district in Essex
Waltham (hundred), a former hundred in Essex
Waltham on the Wolds, Leicestershire
Waltham transmitting station, nearby
Waltham St Lawrence, a small village in Berkshire
White Waltham, a village in Berkshire

New Zealand
Waltham, New Zealand

United States
Waltham, Maine
Waltham, Massachusetts, home of Bentley University and Brandeis University
Waltham, Minnesota
Waltham, Vermont
Waltham Township, Minnesota

Transportation
 Waltham (automobile), a defunct automobile manufacturer
Waltham station, a railroad station in Waltham, Massachusetts, United States
Waltham railway station (England), a former station in Waltham, Lincolnshire, England
Waltham Cross railway station, in Waltham Cross, Hertfordshire, England
Waltham-on-the-Wolds railway station, a former station in Waltham on the Wolds, Leicestershire, England